

Books 
 Thea Astley – Girl with a Monkey
 Nancy Cato – All the Rivers Run
 Catherine Gaskin – Blake's Reach
 Frank Hardy – The Four-Legged Lottery
 Dorothy Hewett - Bobbin Up
 Elizabeth Harrower – The Long Prospect
 Christopher Koch – The Boys in the Island
 Eric Lambert – The Dark Backward
 Hal Porter – A Handful of Pennies
 Olaf Ruhen – Naked Under Capricorn
 Nevil Shute – The Rainbow and the Rose
 Dal Stivens – The Wide Arch
 Randolph Stow – To the Islands
 E. V. Timms – Robina
 Morris West – The Backlash (aka The Second Victory)

Short stories 
 A. Bertram Chandler – "Planet of Ill Repute"
 Peter Cowan – The Unploughed Land : Stories
 Frank Hardy – "The Crookest Raffle Ever Run in Australia"
 Roland Robertson – Black-Feller, White-Feller
 Judith Wright
 "The Colour of Death"
 "The Lame Duck"

Children's and Young Adult fiction 
 Nan Chauncy – Devil's Hill 
 John Gunn – Sea Menace
 Elyne Mitchell – The Silver Brumby
 Mary Elwyn Patchett
 The Brumby
 The Mysterious Pool
 Eleanor Spence – Patterson's Track
 Judith Wright – Kings of the Dingoes

Poetry 

 Bruce Beaver – "White Cat and Brown Girl"
 David Campbell
 "Hear the Bird of Day"
 "On the Birth of a Son"
 "Prayer for Rain"
 Geoffrey Dutton – Antipodes in Shoes
 R. D. Fitzgerald – "The Wind at Your Door"
 Max Harris – "A Window at Night"
 James McAuley – "In a Late Hour"
 David Martin – Poems of David Martin, 1938-1958
 Ian Mudie – "The North-Bound Rider"
 David Rowbotham – Inland : Poems
 Randolph Stow
 "The Embarkation"
 "In Praise of Hillbillies"
 Francis Webb
 "Five Days Old"
 "The Sea"
 The Penguin Book of Australian Verse, edited by John Thompson, Kenneth Slessor and R. G. Howarth

Biography 
 Russell Braddon – End of a Hate
 Ion Idriess – Back o' Cairns
 Elizabeth O'Conner – Steak for Breakfast
 Arthur Mailey – 10 for 66 and All That

Awards and honours

Literary

Children's and Young Adult

Poetry

Births 
A list, ordered by date of birth (and, if the date is either unspecified or repeated, ordered alphabetically by surname) of births in 1958 of Australian literary figures, authors of written works or literature-related individuals follows, including year of death.

 6 March – Paul Hetherington, poet
 6 April – Graeme Base, artist and writer for children
 16 June – Isobelle Carmody, novelist
 11 November – Kathy Lette, novelist
 17 December – Christopher Kelen, novelist and poet

Unknown date
 Debra Adelaide, novelist
 Sarah Day, poet
 Lionel Fogarty, poet
 Steven Herrick, poet
 Kathleen Stewart, novelist and poet

Deaths 
A list, ordered by date of death (and, if the date is either unspecified or repeated, ordered alphabetically by surname) of deaths in 1958 of Australian literary figures, authors of written works or literature-related individuals follows, including year of birth.

 4 January – Philip Lindsay, historical novelist (died in England) (born 1906)
 17 February – Hugh McCrae, poet (born 1876)
 8 April – Ethel Turner, novelist (born 1870)
 2 July – Mary Grant Bruce, novelist (born 1878)
 4 August — Ethel Anderson, poet (born 1883)
 26 September – Arthur Bayldon, poet (born 1865)

See also 
 1958 in Australia
 1958 in literature
 1958 in poetry
 List of years in Australian literature
 List of years in literature

References

 
Australian literature by year
20th-century Australian literature
1958 in literature